In Nomine Dei is a 1993 Portuguese-language play by José Saramago which tells the story of the Anabaptist Münster Rebellion of 1534. It was the basis for the  1993 opera Divara - Wasser und Blut, by Azio Corghi.

References

1993 plays
Works by José Saramago
Portuguese plays
Plays adapted into operas
Plays set in Germany
Plays set in the 16th century